Rossella Farina (born 6 June 1974) is an Italian female retired sprinter, which participated at the 1995 World Championships in Athletics.

Achievements

References

External links
 

1974 births
Living people
Italian female sprinters
World Athletics Championships athletes for Italy
20th-century Italian women
21st-century Italian women